The Eastern Economic Corridor (Abrv: EEC; ,) officially the Eastern Special Development Zone (ESDZ), is a special economic zone of three provinces in eastern Thailand.

The zone was established on 17 January 2017, at the direction of the National Council for Peace and Order (NCPO), with the mission of promoting economic integration across the (Eastern seaboard). The first law of the EEC is the Eastern Special Development Zone Act, proclaimed on 15 May 2019.

History

The Eastern Seaboard Development Programme (ESDP) was initiated as part of the Fifth Economic and Social Development Plan of Thailand (1982–1986). It aimed at developing the region of the eastern seaboard in order to promote industrial growth and to decentralize economic and population growth. The Thai government approached the World Bank for funding, but was turned away as, in the eyes of the bank, the project lacked "economic rationality". Japan rescued the project by providing a modest 178.8 billion yen (US$1.6 billion) in loans, underwriting the construction of 16 projects: ports, roads, waterworks, and industrial parks. Japanese companies then invested heavily in the region. , many of the estimated 5,500 Japanese companies in Thailand have facilities in the area.

After the 2014 coup, the NCPO announced the creation of a special economic zone (SEZ) called the Eastern Economic Corridor (EEC) with a budget of 1.5 trillion baht (US$43 billion) over its first five years. It is a key component of the "Thailand 4.0" economic policy announced in 2016. , the prime minister had invoked the special powers of Section 44 of the interim charter to revoke city plans in three provinces to remove obstacles to EEC development. Planners see the region as strategically important as it borders the gulf as well as being close to Bangkok, and two major airports.

In December 2022, the Thai government approved a 1.35 trillion baht ($44 billion) plan to develop the Eastern Economic Corridor (EEC) into a regional financial hub and a world-class smart city by 2037. The project will be divided into three phases, with the business and financial hub being constructed by 2025 and developed into one of the world's top 10 smart cities by 2037. The government estimates that the smart city will accommodate 350,000 people and create at least 200,000 jobs by 2032. 87.5% of the budget will come from the private sector, 2.8% from the government, and 9.7% from state enterprises or public-private partnerships. The project is expected to boost Thailand's GDP by 2 trillion baht over 10 years. Leased land and property in the EEC business hub and smart city will be transferred back to the government in 50 years.

Administrative divisions

The economic zone includes three principal provinces and two peripheral provinces.

Governing body

The Eastern Special Development Zone Policy Office (ESDZPO) is the governing body of the Eastern Economic Corridor. It is an independent public agency, reporting directly to the prime minister. It was established on 15 May 2019 by the Eastern Special Development Zone (2018) Act and replaced the Eastern Economic Corridor Office.

EEC Secretariat
The EEC Secretariat is headed by the Secretary-General of the Eastern Special Development Zone Policy Office.

Economy

The EEC had a 2013 GDP of US$158.79bn (on a purchasing power parity basis), and US$63.76bn (on a nominal basis), about 15% of Thailand's GDP.

Industries
Twelve Key Industries Identified as Potential Growth Engines for Thailand:

Five S-curve industries:
Next-generation automotive, intelligent electronics, advanced agriculture and biotechnology, food for the future, and high-value and medical tourism.

Seven new S-curve and supporting/emerging industries:
Automation and robotics, aviation and logistics, medical and comprehensive healthcare, biofuel and biochemical, digital, defense, and education and human resource development.

Promotional zones
The EEC Policy Committee approved promotional zones in two categories:
Special Services Promotional Zones : Implementation of infrastructure and technological development
Industrial Promotional Zone : To better facilitate the development of 12 targeted industries

Special services

Industrial
There are currently 26 industrial estates and 2 industrial clusters in the Eastern Economic Corridor (EEC) of Thailand. The industrial estates are:

26 industrial estates: WHA Rayong Industrial Estate, Eastern Seaboard I.E. (Rayong), WHA Eastern Industrial Estate (Map Ta Phut), WHA Eastern Seaboard I.E.1, WHA Chonburi I.E.1, WHA Chonburi I.E.2, WHA Eastern Seaboard I.E.2, WHA Eastern Seaboard I.E.3, WHA Eastern Seaboard I.E.4, CPGC I.E. (Rayong), Amata City Chonburi I.E., Amata City Chonburi I.E. (2nd Project), Amata City Rayong I.E., Pinthong Industrial Estate, Pinthong Industrial Estate (Laem Chabang), Pinthong Industrial Estate (3rd Project), Pinthong Industrial Estate (4th Project), Pinthong Industrial Estate (5th Project), TFD I.E. (2nd Project), Yamato Industries I.E., Smart Park I.E., Asia Clean, Rojana Nongyai, Rojana Lamchabang, WHA Industrial Estate (Rayong), and EGCO Rayong Industrial Estate.

2 industrial clusters: Next-Generation Automotive Banpho and E-Commerce Bang Pakong.

Public transport

Air

The Eastern Economic Corridor is served by U-Tapao International Airport, one of three main commercial airports in the country. As Bangkok's two international airports are currently operating beyond capacity, the government intends to transform U-Tapao into a third major destination for airlines. To support this goal, the state government and private sector have developed a project plan to construct an airport with two 3,500-meter runways and 124 aircraft stands, along with supporting facilities such as an MRO Complex, an Aviation Training Center, and a Ground Transportation Center. The project is being undertaken by U-Tapao International Aviation Company Limited (BBS Joint Venture), which was awarded a 50-year contract and recently signed the Public Private Partnership Agreement of U-Tapao International Airport & Eastern Airport City Project on 19 June 2020. The signing ceremony was presided over by the Prime Minister General Prayut Chan-o-cha. U-Tapao International Aviation Company Limited is a joint venture among three large private companies: Bangkok Airways, BTS Group Holdings, and Sino-Thai Engineering and Construction.

The private sector partners will also construct a third Passenger Terminal Building, a Cargo Village, and a Free Trade Zone, among other commercial areas. These facilities will be seamlessly connected to the airport by a Ground Transportation Center, which will include a high-speed train, buses, and taxis. Additionally, an Automated People Mover (APM) will run through automated walkways and allow passengers to travel to and from the airport quickly and efficiently. The project will be completed in four phases, with the first phase set to be completed by 2024, accommodating 15.9 million passengers, and the final phase scheduled for completion in 2055, accommodating up to 60 million passengers annually.

The Eastern Airport City is a part of the larger initiative to improve transportation and logistics infrastructure in the EEC. It is a planned mixed-use development that will be integrated with U-Tapao International Airport, serving as a hub for aviation-related industries, logistics, and tourism. The Airport City will feature various commercial areas, including hotels, shopping malls, convention centers, and office buildings. The development is expected to attract both domestic and international investors, creating jobs and spurring economic growth in the region.

Rail

The Eastern Economic Corridor is served by the State Railway of Thailand's (SRT) Eastern Line. The main stations are Chachoengsao Junction railway station and Chon Buri railway station.

A high-speed rail line is planned to serve the EEC. The Don Mueang–Suvarnabhumi–U-Tapao high-speed railway will connect Don Mueang International Airport, Suvarnabhumi Airport and U-Tapao International Airport. On 24 October 2019, a 224.5 billion baht (US$7.4bn) contract was signed by the Thai government and a consortium led by Charoen Pokphand Holding to build the railway. The consortium includes Charoen Pokphand (CP); Ch. Karnchang PLC (CK); Bangkok Expressway and Metro PLC (BEM); Italian-Thai Development PLC (ITD); and China Railway Construction Corporation Limited (CRCC). The 220 kilometre line will consist of 181 kilometres of elevated track, eight kilometres of underground track, and two kilometres of surface track. Construction of the rail line will begin 12 to 24 months from the date of contract signing. Trains on the route will operate at maximum speeds of 250 kmph. The consortium will have the right to operate and manage the rail line for 50 years after which project assets will revert to the government.

Road
The Ministry of Transport's plan to extend Motorway 7 (Bangkok-Chon Buri-Map Ta Phut) to connect U-Tapao International Airport with seaports and the Bangkok metropolitan area is aimed at integrating land transportation.

Water

A passenger-only ferry service from Pattaya to Hua Hin began operation on 12 January 2017 and is operated by Royal Passenger Liner. By road, the journey takes five to six hours. The ferry shortens travel time to about two hours, subject to sea conditions. The ferry cruises at 27 knots on the 113 km journey across the Gulf of Thailand with a maximum passenger capacity of 150 persons. Larger ferries carrying up to 260 people may be added to the service later. Ferries capable of carrying vehicles are projected for 2020.

The Eastern Economic Corridor is served by two ports: Laem Chabang Port and Map Ta Phut Port. Laem Chabang Port is main international port from its opening in 1991. It is Thailand's largest port. The port occupies  and is capable of handling the largest (Post-Panamax) vessels.

Health, education and research
The EEC is home to Burapha University, Amata University (EEC campus of National Taiwan University), CMKL University (Carnegie Mellon University), and Asian Institute of Hospitality Management (Les Roches International School of Hotel Management, Switzerland). The University of Tokyo (Japan), Kyoto University (Japan), Waseda University (Japan), Hohai University (China), Hong Kong University of Science and Technology, and the Auckland University of Technology plan to open campuses in the EEC.

See also
Southern Economic Corridor (SEC)
Central–Western Economic Corridor (CWEC)
Northern Economic Corridor (NEC)
Northeastern Economic Corridor (NEEC)
Special Economic Zones (SEZ)

References

Further reading

External links
 Eastern Economic Corridor website
 EECa website
 EECd website
 EECi website
 EECmd website
 EECtp website
 Wang Chan Valley website

Regions of Thailand
Industrial parks in Thailand
Economy of Thailand
Gulf of Thailand
Special economic zones